Song Runtong (born 18 September 2001) is a Chinese footballer who plays as a forward for Qingdao Youth Island, on loan from Shanghai Shenhua.

Career statistics

Club
.

References

2001 births
Living people
Chinese footballers
China youth international footballers
Association football forwards
China League Two players
Chinese Super League players
Shanghai Shenhua F.C. players
Qingdao F.C. players